Lasith Lakshan (born 1 February 1996) is a Sri Lankan cricketer. He made his first-class debut for Sri Lanka Ports Authority Cricket Club in the 2015–16 Premier League Tournament on 4 December 2015. He was signed by Accrington Cricket Club to play for the team during the 2021 summer in England.

References

External links
 

1996 births
Living people
Sri Lankan cricketers
Burgher Recreation Club cricketers
Sri Lanka Ports Authority Cricket Club cricketers
People from Matara, Sri Lanka